Topsfield Hall was a Georgian house in Crouch End, London. The Hornsey Historical Society believes it to have been built in around 1785 by Samuel Ellis, and by 1894 it had been demolished.

References

External links 

Demolished buildings and structures in London
Crouch End